"(I'm in a) Dancing Mood" is a pop song written and recorded by Delroy Wilson.

Jo Jo Zep & The Falcons version

"(I'm in a) Dancing Mood" was recorded by Australian blues, rock and R&B band Jo Jo Zep & The Falcons. The song was released in October 1977 as the lead single from their second studio album, Whip It Out (1977). The song peaked at number 90 on the Kent Music Report in Australia. It was recorded a few months prior by Australian reggae, R&B band Billy T, as a b-side.

Track listing 
7" (OZ-11555) 
Side A – "(I'm in a) Dancing Mood" - 3:35
Side B – "I Remember" - 4:13

Charts

References 

1977 singles
Jo Jo Zep & The Falcons songs
Year of song missing
1977 songs